Alen Milosevic (born 24 December 1989) is a Swiss handball player for SC DHfK Leipzig and the Swiss national team.

He represented Switzerland at the 2020 European Men's Handball Championship.

References

External links

1989 births
Living people
Swiss male handball players
Sportspeople from Bern
Expatriate handball players
Swiss expatriate sportspeople in Germany
Handball-Bundesliga players